Chouchou is a 2003 French comedy film about a maghrebin man who settles in Paris to find his nephew. The film stars Gad Elmaleh as the title character Chouchou, for which he was nominated the César Award for Best Actor.

Cast
Gad Elmaleh : Chouchou 
Alain Chabat : Stanislas 
Claude Brasseur : Father Léon
Roschdy Zem :  Brother Jean
Catherine Frot : Nicole Milovavovich
Julien Courbey : Yekea  
Catherine Hosmalin : Madame Armand
Micheline Presle : Stanislas's Mother
Jacques Sereys : Stanislas's Father
Arié Elmaleh : Vanessa 
Yacine Mesbah : Djamila 
Jean-Paul Comart : Inspector Molino 
Anne Marivin : The seller

References

External links 
 
 
 Chouchou on AlloCiné

2003 comedy films
2003 films
French comedy films
Transgender-related films
Films about race and ethnicity
Films set in France
Films set in Paris
Films directed by Merzak Allouache
French LGBT-related films
2000s French films
2000s French-language films